Petre Varodi (born 18 February 1949) is a Romanian former football midfielder.

Honours
ASA Târgu Mureș
Divizia B: 1970–71

References

1949 births
Living people
Romanian footballers
Association football midfielders
Liga I players
Liga II players
Liga III players
CSM Avântul Reghin players
ASA Târgu Mureș (1962) players
People from Reghin